Drew Snyder (born September 25, 1946 in Buffalo, New York) is an American actor of film and television. He is best known for his roles in films such as Commando, Firestarter, and Cruel Intentions, a well as numerous guest and recurring roles in several well-known television series including American Horror Story, NYPD Blue, and Life Goes On.

Selected filmography

 Kojak (1977) – Stuart Bayliss
 The Incredible Hulk (1979) – Croft
 Night School (1981) – Vincent Millett
 CHiPs (1981) – Joshua
 Death Wish II (1982) – Deputy Commissioner Hawkins
 Another World (1982) – Sam Egan
 Magnum, P.I. (1982) – Jack Curry
 Seven Brides for Seven Brothers (1982) – Coach
 WarGames (1983) – Ayers
 Space Raiders (1983) – Aldebarian
 Emerald Point N.A.S. (1984) – Malcolm Endicott 
 Hill Street Blues (1984) – Hit Man
 Purple Hearts (1984) – Lieutenant Colonel Larimore
 Firestarter (1984) – Orville Jamieson
 The Falcon and the Snowman (1984) – FBI Interrogator
 Dynasty (1985) – Hank Lowther
 Commando (1985) – Lawson
 Ryan's Hope (1986) – Harlan Ransome
 The Secret of My Success (1987) – Burt Foster
 ABC Afterschool Specials (1980–1988) – Pharmacies
 Baywatch (1990) – Jack Burton
 21 Jump Street (1990) – Mr. Van Every
 No Secrets (1991) – Driver
 Project Eliminator (1991) – FBI Agent Willis
 Late for Dinner (1991) – Albert
 L.A. Law (1990–1992) – Bernard Lavelle
 Dance with Death (1992) – Hopper
 Universal Soldier (1992) – Charles
 Life Goes On (1992) – Bill Swanson 
 Born Yesterday (1993) – Senator Dorn
 Snapdragon (1993) – Coroner
 The Glass Shield (1994) – Sheriff Sergeant
 Separate Lives (1995) – Robert Porter
 Jade (1995) – Executive
 Nixon (1995) – Moderator
 The Fan (1996) – Burrows
 JAG (1997) – Judge
 Ground Control (1998) – David, Flight 47 Pilot
 ER (1999) – Mr. Drane
 Cruel Intentions (1999) – Headmaster Hargrove
 Touched by an Angel (1999) – Doug Randolph
 The Practice (1999) – Assistant District Attorney Thompson
 Ally McBeal (1999) – Hughes
 The Operator (2000) – Richard Blackburn
 NYPD Blue (2000) – Oscar Webb
 7th Heaven (2000) – Jack Connelly
 Lost Souls (2000) – Doctor
 The Glass House (2001) – Mr. Morgan
 Hokum County Homicide (2002) – George Reynolds
 Determination of Death (2002) – Riley
 Cold Case (2005) – Billy Jones 2005
 Zombie Bankers (2010) – Carson
 Ovation (2015) – Party Guest
 American Horror Story (2015) – Televangelist
 Code Black (2016) – Arlo

References

External links

1946 births
Living people
American people of German descent
American male actors